The Turkey Valley Community School District is a rural public school district headquartered in Jackson Junction, Iowa, serving grades Pre-K through 12th.

The district occupies portions of Winneshiek, Chickasaw, Fayette, and Howard counties. Municipalities in its boundary include Jackson Junction, Fort Atkinson, Lawler, Protivin, St. Lucas, and Waucoma. Unincorporated areas in the district boundaries include Little Turkey. In the 2012–2013 school year the enrollment was 381.

Schools
The Turkey Valley Community School serves grades PreK-12. The school is located in Jackson Junction and has separate elementary and secondary sections. Features include a garden, a playground, a soccer field, a combined American football and track facility, and other ball-based sport areas. A report from the Winneshiek County government described the campus as "large" and "rural".

Turkey Valley Junior-Senior High School

Athletics
The Trojans compete in the Upper Iowa Conference in the following sports:

Cross Country
Volleyball
Football
Basketball
Girls Basketball 2016 Class 1A State Runner-Up
Girls Basketball 2017 Class 1A State Runner-Up
Wrestling
2018 Class 2A Dual Team State Champions (as NHTV)
Track and Field
 1987 Class 3A State Champions
 2002 Class 1A State Runner-Up
 2003 Class 1A State Runner-Up
 2004 Class 1A State Runner-Up
Golf 
Soccer
Baseball
 1985 Class 3A State Champions (Turkey Valley) 
Softball
 1982 State Champions

See also
List of school districts in Iowa
List of high schools in Iowa

References

External links
 Turkey Valley Community School District
 
 

School districts in Iowa
Education in Chickasaw County, Iowa
Education in Fayette County, Iowa
Education in Howard County, Iowa
Education in Winneshiek County, Iowa
School districts established in 1960
1960 establishments in Iowa